Liechtenstein is a principality governed under a constitutional monarchy. It has a form of mixed constitution in which political power is shared by the monarch and a democratically elected parliament. There is a two-party system (though there are two minor parties as well) and a form of representative democracy in which the prime minister and head of government is responsible to parliament. However the Prince of Liechtenstein is head of state and exercises considerable political powers.

The executive power is exercised by the Cabinet of Liechtenstein (government). Legislative power is vested in both the government and the Landtag (Parliament). The party system is dominated by the conservative Progressive Citizens' Party and the liberal-conservative Patriotic Union. The Judiciary is independent of the executive and the legislature.

The country replaced universal male suffrage with universal suffrage in 1984, following a national referendum.

On 15 August 2002, in his National Day Address, Prince Hans-Adam II announced that after months of intensive negotiations, a compromise in the debate on constitutional reform had been reached. On 13 September, Prime Minister Otmar Hasler confirmed to Parliament that his government was drafting a bill for Parliament based on the compromise reached between the Prince and the Citizens' Forum. The draft bill, which would increase the executive powers of the monarch, went before Parliament for a first reading in November. Once approved by Parliament, the bill was then presented to voters in a referendum, and approved by 64% of those voting on 16 March 2003. In June 2012, people decided overwhelmingly in the referendum that Crown Prince Alois should be allowed to retain his power of veto over decisions made in nationwide ballots.

Executive branch

|Prince
|Hans-Adam II
|
|13 November 1989
|-
|Prince-regent
|Alois
|
|15 August 2004
|-
|Prime Minister
|Daniel Risch
|Patriotic Union
|25 March 2021
|}

The monarch is hereditary. Following legislative elections, the head of government is appointed by the prince and proposed and voted on by the parliament. Thus the government is usually composed of the members of the majority party. It is, however, also customary that the leader of the largest minority party in the Diet is appointed the deputy head of government by the monarch.
According to the constitution of Liechtenstein, the government is a collegiate body and consists of the head of government and four governmental councilors.

Amendment to the constitution or new law have to be adopted by Parliament, signed by both the Prince and the head of government, and published in the Principality's Law Gazette.

Prince Hans Adam II is the current head of state. His constitutional powers include the power to veto any legislation, to be used at his discretion, as well as the dissolution of the parliament (this may be subject to a referendum). He represents the state vis-à-vis foreign states. He signs international treaties either in person or delegates this function to a plenipotentiary. Some treaties under international law only become valid when they have been ratified by Parliament. On the basis of the names put forward by Parliament, the Prince nominates the government, district and high court judges, the judges of the Supreme Court, and the presidents and their deputies of the Constitutional Court and of the Administrative Court of Appeal. The Prince's other authorities include exercising the right to mitigate and commute punishments that have been imposed with legal force and the abolition — i.e., the dismissal — of investigations that have been initiated. All judgments are issued in the name of the Prince.

In August 2004, Prince Hans-Adam handed over the day-to-day running of the country to his son, Crown Prince Alois, while still remaining the official head of state.

The Government of Liechtenstein is based on the principle of collegiality; namely, of colleagues collaborating with each other. The government consists of the head of government and four Councilors. The members of the government are proposed by the Parliament and are appointed by the Prince. Only men or women born in Liechtenstein, and who are eligible to be elected to Parliament, may be elected to the government committee. The two electoral areas of the country, the highlands and the lowlands, are entitled to at least two members of the government, and their respective deputies must come from the same area.

Legislative branch

The Prince's involvement in legislation consists in a right to take initiatives in the form of government bills and in the right to veto parliamentary proposals. The Prince has the power to enact princely decrees. Emergency princely decrees are possible when the security and welfare of the country is at stake. A countersignature by the head of government is, nevertheless, required. The Prince has the right to convene and adjourn parliament and, for serious reasons, to adjourn it for 3 months or to dissolve it.

The Landtag of Liechtenstein has 25 members, elected for a four-year term by proportional representation in two multi-seat constituencies. Until 1989, 15 members represented the population of the two constituencies (six for the lowland area and nine for the highland area). Since 1989 the lowland constituency has been entitled to have 10 members and the highland area 15.
The Landtag's main task is to discuss and adopt resolutions on constitutional proposals and draft government bills. It has the additional duties of giving its assent to important international treaties; of electing members of the government, judges, and board members of the Principality's institutions; setting the annual budget and approving taxes and other public charges; and supervising the administration of the state.
The Landtag observes its rights and duties in the course of sessions of the whole Landtag and through the parliamentary commissions that it elects. All members of the Landtag exercise their mandates in addition to their normal professions or occupations. The President of the Landtag and his deputy are both elected at the opening meeting for the current year. The president convenes the individual meetings during the session, leads them, and represent the Landtag externally. During the parliamentary recess — normally from January to February/March — a "state committee" assumes Parliament's duties, and such a committee must also be elected in the case of any adjournment or dissolution of Parliament. A "state committee" consists of the president of Parliament and four other members.
The duties and working procedures of Parliament are laid down in the constitution and in Parliament's standing orders.

Moreover, the people of Liechtenstein have very strong direct democratic rights. If called for by at least 1,000 citizens, a referendum on any law can be initiated. Referendums can suspend parliament or change the constitution, but at least 1500 citizens must vote affirmative, so referendums to suspend parliament or change the constitution fail if they have low turnout even if the required percentage of total voters is met.

Political parties and elections

The political parties are in practice politically decisive and are the moving forces with regard to the composition of the government. In the 2001-05 legislature period of office, one Councillor and three deputies were women.

From 1938 to 1997 Liechtenstein had a coalition government. Until recently there were only two parties in Parliament: the Patriotic Union and the Progressive Citizens' Party. Liechtenstein's distinctive form of coalition government came to an end in April 1997, when the Patriotic Union won an absolute majority of seats. It took sole responsibility for the government during the 1997 to 2001 Parliament, with its members filling all the positions on the government committee. Between 2001 and 2009, the Progressive Citizen's Party formed the government, winning an absolute majority in the 2001 elections and the most seats in the 2005 elections. The Patriotic Union once again won an absolute majority of seats in the February 2009 elections. Minority parties, as opposition parties, act as a check on the government in Parliament and on parliamentary commissions.

Liechtenstein parliamentary election, 2017

Judicial branch

The Judiciary of Liechtenstein is made up of the Supreme Court, the Princely Superior Court, and the Princely Court.

Administrative divisions
Liechtenstein is divided in eleven communes; Balzers, Eschen, Gamprin, Mauren, Planken, Ruggell, Schaan, Schellenberg, Triesen, Triesenberg, and Vaduz.

International organization participation
Liechtenstein is a member of the following organizations:
Council of Europe 
EBRD 
U.N. Economic Commission for Europe 
European Free Trade Association
International Atomic Energy Agency
International Criminal Court
ICRM
IFRCS
Intelsat, Interpol
International Olympic Committee
ITU
OPCW
Organization for Security and Co-Operation in Europe
PCA
United Nations
UNCTAD
Universal Postal Union, WCL
World Intellectual Property Organization
World Trade Organization

References

 

de:Liechtenstein#Politik